Wilhelm van der Sluys is a South African rugby union player for the  in Super Rugby, the  in the Currie Cup and the  in the Rugby Challenge. His usual position is lock.

He came through the  youth system and played for them at various youth levels.

He played for Maties Rugby Club (Stellenbosch University) for seven years. He represented Maties in the Varsity Cup and Western Province Super league.

He made his first team debut for Western Province during the 2012 Vodacom Cup, coming on as a substitute in their game against . He made a total of six appearances in that campaign, including in the final win against .

He was then also included in the squad for the 2012 Currie Cup Premier Division.

On 26 July 2017, Van der Sluys signed a one-year contract with English Premiership side Exeter Chiefs ahead of the 2017–18 season.

References

South African rugby union players
Living people
Afrikaner people
South African people of Dutch descent
1991 births
Western Province (rugby union) players
Sportspeople from Paarl
Alumni of Paarl Boys' High School
Southern Kings players
Worcester Warriors players
Rotherham Titans players
London Scottish F.C. players
Exeter Chiefs players
Lions (United Rugby Championship) players
Golden Lions players
Rugby union locks
Rugby union players from the Western Cape